Körmend ( Prekmurje Slovene: Karmadén) is a town in Vas county , Western Hungary.

Places of interest
The town is especially well known for its castle which used to belong to the Batthyány family, one of the most important aristocrat families of Hungary. Blessed Ladislaus Batthyány-Strattmann (1870–1931), a famous ophthalmologist who was beatified by the Catholic Church, lived in the castle with his family for nearly 10 years. He turned one of the wings of the castle into an ophthalmology clinic where he treated poor patients for free.

Today, the castle belongs to the Hungarian state.

Sport
Körmendi FC, association football club
BC Körmend, basketball club

Notable people
Prince Edmund Batthyany-Strattmann (1826–1914), nobleman
László Batthyány-Strattmann (1870–1931), doctor and nobleman
Sándor Bejczy (1920–2004), politician
Imre Sinkovits (1928–2001), actor of the National Theatre
Péter Besenyei (born 1956), aerobatic pilot
Soulwave (formed 2007), alternative rock band
Krisztián Pars (born 1982), hammer thrower

Twin towns – sister cities

Körmend is twinned with:
 Heinävesi, Finland
 Fürstenfeld, Austria

 Kranenburg, Germany
 Rožnov pod Radhoštěm, Czech Republic
 Yuzhne, Ukraine

References

External links
 in Hungarian and German
Street map of Körmend
Körmend in wiki.utikonyvem.hu

Populated places in Vas County